The 1985–86 Austrian Hockey League season was the 56th season of the Austrian Hockey League, the top level of ice hockey in Austria. Six teams participated in the league, and EC KAC won the championship.

First round

Final round

Playoffs

Semifinals
EC KAC - EV Innsbruck 2:0 (6:5 SO, 4:1)
EV VSV - VEU Feldkirch 0:2 (3:5, 1:6)

Final
EC KAC - VEU Feldkirch 2:0 (11:5, 6:1)

External links
Austrian Ice Hockey Association

Austria
Austrian Hockey League seasons
League